Patrick Dewaere is a 1992 French documentary film directed by Marc Esposito, about the actor of the same name. It was screened out of competition at the 1992 Cannes Film Festival.

References

External links

1992 films
1990s French-language films
French documentary films
Documentary films about actors
Films directed by Marc Esposito
1992 documentary films
1990s French films